Green Mountain is a rural unincorporated community and census-designated place in Marshall County, Iowa, United States. It is located in Marion Township.  As of the 2010 Census the population of Green Mountain was 126.

History
 As early as 1856, a few settlers from Vermont settled about a mile north of the present-day community; they named their community after their home in Vermont. The present-day town of Green Mountain, south of the original townsite, was established in 1883, platted by the Iowa Construction Company. The town was built adjacent to the Chicago Great Western Railroad. 

The Green Mountain Congregational Church, one of the first in the county, was built in Green Mountain, along with a grain elevator and a few businesses; a savings bank was constructed in 1907. The population of the community was 41 in 1902.

Green Mountain, Iowa was the site of the Green Mountain train wreck. The wreck is known as the worst ever in Iowa history, as 52 people were killed in the accident on March 21, 1910.

In 1925, Green Mountain's population was 106.

Demographics

Education
The GMG Community School District serves the community. The district was established on July 1, 1992, by the merger of the Garwin and Green Mountain school districts.

References

Unincorporated communities in Marshall County, Iowa
Unincorporated communities in Iowa
Populated places established in 1883